Centrotypus is a genus of true bugs belonging to the family Membracidae.

Species:

Centrotypus acuticornis 
Centrotypus aduncus 
Centrotypus amplicornis 
Centrotypus assamensis 
Centrotypus ater 
Centrotypus belus 
Centrotypus bowringi 
Centrotypus chrysopterus 
Centrotypus curvocornis 
Centrotypus erigens 
Centrotypus flavescens 
Centrotypus flexuosa 
Centrotypus folicornis 
Centrotypus forticornis 
Centrotypus heinrichsi 
Centrotypus javanensis 
Centrotypus laminifer 
Centrotypus langei 
Centrotypus laticornis 
Centrotypus latimargo 
Centrotypus longicornis 
Centrotypus malabaricus 
Centrotypus merinjakensis 
Centrotypus neocornis 
Centrotypus neuter 
Centrotypus nigris 
Centrotypus ortus 
Centrotypus oxyricornis 
Centrotypus pactolus 
Centrotypus perakensis 
Centrotypus pulniensis 
Centrotypus securis 
Centrotypus shelfordi 
Centrotypus siamensis 
Centrotypus tauriformis 
Centrotypus taurus

References

Membracidae